Anaimalai is a new taluk separated from Pollachi in Coimbatore district.

Anaimalai may also refer to:

 Anamalai Tiger Reserve
 Anaimalai Hills
 Anamalai Block
 Anaimalai taluk
 Anaimalai dravidogecko
 Anaimalai earth snake
 Anamalai loach